Albert Allison Dysart (March 22, 1880 – December 8, 1962) was a New Brunswick politician, lawyer and judge.

Dysart was born in Cocagne, New Brunswick and was educated at University of St. Joseph's College in Memramcook, the Ontario Agricultural College and Dalhousie Law School. He was called to the bar in 1913 and set up practice in Bouctouche. He was elected to the provincial legislature in 1917 and served as Speaker from 1921 to 1925 and served briefly as Minister of Lands and Mines in 1925 until the defeat of the Liberal government.

In 1926, Dysart succeeded Peter J. Veniot as leader of the Liberal party. In 1935 the Liberals returned to power and Dysart became the 22nd premier of New Brunswick. Dysart also served as his own Minister of Public Works from 1935 to 1938, and Chairman of the New Brunswick Electric Power Commission, from 1938 until his retirement from politics. His government introduced the first Landlord and Tenants Act in 1938 and updated the Labour Relations Act. It attempted to create jobs in the Great Depression through extensive road construction. After suffering from poor health from some time, he led the government to re-election in 1939 and resigned in 1940 to become a County Court Judge of Westmorland and Kent Counties. He served in that position until his retirement in 1955.

His former home in Shediac, New Brunswick is a registered historic place. He lived there from 1943 until his death.

References 

1880 births
1962 deaths
St. Joseph's College alumni
Ontario Agricultural College alumni
Dalhousie University alumni
Lawyers in New Brunswick
Judges in New Brunswick
Premiers of New Brunswick
Speakers of the Legislative Assembly of New Brunswick
People from Kent County, New Brunswick
New Brunswick Liberal Association MLAs
New Brunswick Liberal Association leaders